The Mount Washington Cog Railway, also known as the Cog, is the world's first mountain-climbing cog railway (rack-and-pinion railway). The railway climbs Mount Washington in New Hampshire, United States. It uses a Marsh rack system and both steam and biodiesel-powered locomotives to carry tourists to the top of the mountain.

It is the second steepest rack railway in the world after the Pilatus Railway in Switzerland, with an average grade of over 25% and a maximum grade of 37%. Steam locomotives take approximately 65 minutes to ascend and 40 minutes to descend, while the biodiesel engines can go up in as little as 36 minutes.

Most of the Mount Washington Cog Railway is in Thompson and Meserve's Purchase, with the part of the railway nearest to Mount Washington's summit being in Sargent's Purchase.

History

The railway was built by Sylvester Marsh who grew up in Campton. Marsh came up with the idea while climbing the mountain in 1852. His plan was treated as insane. Local tradition says that the state legislature voted permission based on a consensus that harm resulting from operating it was no issue – since the design was attempting the impossible – but benefits were guaranteed. He was putting up $5,000 of his own money, and that, plus whatever else he could raise, would be spent locally, including building the Fabyan House hotel at nearby Fabyan Station to accommodate the expected tourists. The railway is sometimes called "Railway to the Moon", because one state legislator remarked during the proceedings that Marsh should be given a charter, not merely up Mount Washington, but also to the moon.

Marsh obtained a charter for the road on June 25, 1858, but the American Civil War prevented any action until 1866. He developed a prototype locomotive and a short demonstration section of track, then found investors, forming the Mount Washington Railway Company in the spring of 1866, and started construction. The route closely followed a mountain trail that had been established earlier in the century by Ethan Allen Crawford.

Despite the railroad's incomplete state, the first paying customers started riding on August 14, 1868, and the construction reached the summit in July 1869. The early locomotives -- represented today by the restored display locomotive, #1 Old Peppersass – all had vertical boilers, like many stationary steam engines of the time; the boilers were mounted to the locomotives' frames with twin trunnions, allowing them to pivot as the locomotive and coach climbed the grade, permitting gravity to always keep the boiler vertically oriented, no matter what the gradient of the track. Later designs introduced horizontal boilers, slanted so that they remain close to horizontal on the steeply graded track.

In August 1869, President Ulysses S. Grant visited New England to escape the heat of summer in Washington, D.C. During his tour he rode the cog railway to the top of Mount Washington.

Running the railway
Sylvester Marsh died in 1884 and control of the Cog passed to the Concord & Montreal Railroad, which ran it until 1889 when the Boston & Maine Railroad took over. From 1868 to 1910, the locomotives were fired with wood. In 1910, the railway converted to using coal for all its locomotives.

Control by the Teagues began in 1931 when Col. Henry N. Teague bought the Cog. He died in 1951, and Arthur S. Teague became general manager, then gained ownership in 1961. (Arthur Teague was the colonel's protégé, but no relation.) After he died in 1967, the ownership passed to his wife, Ellen Crawford Teague, who ran the Cog as the world's first woman president of a railway. In 1983, Mrs. Teague sold the railway to a group of New Hampshire businessmen. From 1986 to 2017, the Cog Railway was controlled and owned by Wayne Presby and Joel Bedor of Littleton, New Hampshire. The Bedor and Presby families also owned the Mount Washington Hotel and Resort in Bretton Woods for the period 1991–2006. In 1995, the railway appointed Charles Kenison the General Manager. These individuals were responsible for a complete revitalization of the railroad, with the assistance of Al LaPrade, a mechanical engineer whose career began at the Portsmouth Naval Shipyard. The Cog has been in continuous operation since 1869, with service interruptions only during the World Wars.

In the summer of 2008, the Cog introduced its first diesel locomotive. The Great Recession and the 2000s energy crisis led to fewer passengers, and the Cog sought to cut costs with the diesel, which could make three round trips for the cost of one steam train round trip.

However, the proposal drew opposition due to its location in the alpine zone of the mountain and was shelved.

In April 2017, the Bedor family sold its interest in the railway to Wayne Presby, the only remaining member of the original group, which had purchased the railway in 1983. Presby assumed direct management control of the railway in December 2017. In 2021, the railway completed two of the largest improvement projects in its history. The existing  rail was replaced with  rail and a new  maintenance facility was completed. The new facility enabled the railway to resume winter operations in 2020.

"Devil's shingle" slideboards

In the early days of the railway's construction, the workers wanted to minimize time when climbing and descending the ramp, so they invented slideboards fitting over the cog rack and providing enough room for themselves and their tools. The average time for the descent of the mountain using these boards was about 15 minutes. The record was 2:45, an average speed above .

The "Devil's shingles" were banned in 1908 after the accidental death of an employee. However, that did not stop workers, and there are sources claiming the shingles were used by some up until the 1920s. Later, the design of the rack was changed so that the old braking mechanism could no longer grip.

Accidents
The first of two major accidents in the railway's history occurred in 1929, involving locomotive #1 (first named Hero and later Old Peppersass because of its vertical boiler's resemblance to a pepper sauce bottle). This locomotive was used to build the railway, and operated until retirement in 1878. After a few years on display locally, it was shipped to the World's Columbian Exposition in 1893. The Baltimore and Ohio Railroad (B&O) took possession of the locomotive after the Exposition, and stored it in Baltimore until the 1927 Fair of the Iron Horse celebrating the B&O's 100th birthday. The Boston & Maine Railroad restored Old Peppersass at its Concord shops following the Fair to make a commemorative trip for the railway's 60th anniversary. After ascending to Jacob's Ladder, the locomotive began a planned descent but jumped up and landed to the right of the cog rail when a tooth broke from a gear wheel. The friction brake was unable to prevent the locomotive from accelerating downhill. The crew jumped to safety (though some suffered broken bones), but a photographer riding the engine to take publicity photos fell to his death as the engine plunged off the trestle. The locomotive broke into pieces, but the boiler did not rupture, and the pieces were later reassembled to reconstruct the locomotive for static display. It is now located at the Cog Railway Base Station.

On September 17, 1967, eight passengers were killed and 72 injured when Engine no. 3 derailed at the Skyline switch, about a mile below the summit. The engine rolled off the trestle while the uncoupled passenger car slid several hundred feet into a large rock. An investigation revealed that the Skyline switch had not been properly configured for the descending train. The railway nonetheless has a solid safety record, having taken more than five million people to the summit during its existence; a brakeman now watches for safety hazards from the leading end platform of the passenger car.

Mechanical design
The cog railway designs and builds all of its locomotives and passenger coaches at the company shops located at the base of Mount Washington.

Each train consists of a locomotive pushing a single passenger car up the mountain, descending the mountain by going in reverse. Both locomotive and car were originally equipped with a ratchet and pawl mechanism engaged during the climb that prevents any roll-back; during descent, both locomotive and car are braked. Recent improvements in design have replaced the ratchet (gear and pawl mechanism) with sprag clutches and disc brake assemblies. Most of the locomotives were made by the Manchester Locomotive Works.

The rack rail design used is one of Marsh's own inventions, using a ladder-like rack with open bar rungs engaged by the teeth of the cog wheel. This system allows snow and debris to fall through the rack, rather than lodging in it. A similar design, called the Riggenbach rack system, was invented by engineer Niklaus Riggenbach in Switzerland at about the same time. The Swiss Consul to the United States visited Marsh while constructing the railway up Mount Washington, and his enthusiastic reports persuaded the Swiss government to commission Riggenbach to build the Vitznau-Rigi-Bahn on Mount Rigi, which opened on May 21, 1871.

Initially, there was no way for two trains to pass one another on the Mount Washington Cog Railway. In 1941, a nine-motion switch was invented, and two spur sidings were added, each long enough to divert two descending trains so that climbing trains could continue to the summit, enabling more round trips per day.

In 2004, work was completed replacing the lower Waumbek Switch and Siding with an  passing loop equipped with electric and hydraulically powered automated switches. These switches are powered by batteries and recharged by solar panels. One switch is located at each end of the loop, allowing ascending and descending trains to pass one another.

In 2014, work began on another switch and siding at the summit of Mount Washington. When completed, the new switch will allow trains to pass one another at the summit of the mountain.

In 2008, work began on the first diesel locomotive to be powered with biodiesel, with the assistance of a retired mechanical engineer from the Portsmouth Naval Shipyard. By 2019, the railway completed the construction of seven of these locomotives.

Modern operations

The most common trips on the Cog Railway are between the two main stations, one at the summit and the other adjacent to the operators' logistical and repair base.

From 2003 to 2006, "ski trains" ran, stopping at an intermediate station, from which passengers could ski down to the Base Station.

The Cog Railway track crosses over three hiking trails, including the Gulfside Trail, which is part of the Appalachian Trail. Some hikers have been known to wait for the next train in order to expose their buttocks to the passengers, a practice known as "Mooning the Cog."  Several hikers were arrested for performing this act in 2007.  The railway was in operation before these trails existed and they cross railroad property.

Access to the base station by car is by three routes, each culminating with the upper portion of the dead-end Cog Base Road. The advertised, roughly eastbound route uses the Base Road's full length from Bretton Woods. The Jefferson Notch Road is closed to wheeled vehicles in winterand usually before and afterand used primarily by snowmobiles. The roughly northbound route from U.S. Route 302 in Crawford Notch via Mt. Clinton Road is also closed in the winter to vehicular traffic. Operations of trains all winter began in 2004–2005, and the Cog Base Road is plowed and sanded all winter to allow tourists, skiers, and employees access to the Base Station.

Environmental concerns
The steam locomotives on the railway generate large amounts of smoke, nicknamed "Cog Smog". The railway is exempted from the state's air-pollution-control law (RSA 125-C:20), which exempts "any steam locomotives and engines or replacements thereof used in connection with the operation of a railroad or railway which were in operation or on order prior to January 1, 1973, and are located entirely within the state."

Each  steam locomotive ride burns  of coal and consumes  of water.

One steam locomotive was converted to oil-firing in 2008. The attempt to oil-fire the existing steam locomotives failed, and in 2008 the railway introduced its first diesel locomotive, designed and built by the railroad staff. Since 2008, four more diesels were completed (M-2 and M-3 in 2009, M-4 in 2011, and M-5 in 2013). All the new diesel hydraulic locomotives are operated on B20 (20% biodiesel blend) during the summer season. The company declared that the primary reason the new diesels were built was to reduce the visual pollution caused by the coal-fired steam locomotives, to lower emissions, and to increase the length of time that passengers could spend at the summit of Mount Washington.

The locomotives push passenger cars that have a capacity of 70 riders. The Cog Railway also rosters eight wooden coaches.

Locomotives

See also

 Conway Scenic Railroad
 List of rack railways
 Pikes Peak Cog Railway
 Mount Washington Auto Road
 New Hampshire Historical Marker 45: Cog Railway
 Quincy and Torch Lake Cog Railway

References

External links

 www.thecog.com – Mount Washington Cog Railway official site
 Mount Washington Cog Railway locomotive roster
 Mount Washington Cog Railway photos
 Mount Washington Railway Company – Historical Timeline
 "Among the Clouds" by John H. Ackerman, American Heritage Magazine, April 1968, Volume 19, Issue 3
 ASME/ASCE 1962 designation of Mount Washington Cog Railway as a National Historic Mechanical and Civil Engineering Landmark

Heritage railroads in New Hampshire
Boston and Maine Railroad
Mountain railways
Cog Railway
Historic Civil Engineering Landmarks
Rack railways in the United States
Tourist attractions in Coös County, New Hampshire
Transportation in Coös County, New Hampshire
4 ft 8 in gauge railways in the United States
Historic Mechanical Engineering Landmarks
1868 establishments in New Hampshire